Death Metal is a 1984 split album by the bands Helloween, Hellhammer, Running Wild, and Dark Avenger. It contains the only recorded material by the German group Dark Avenger.

The album offers a snapshot of the Central European metal scene during the end of the early 1980s. At that time, Running Wild had yet to develop their "pirate metal" schtick and considered themselves a black metal band. Helloween were more of a thrashy speed metal act rather than the melodic power metal vehicle into which they would soon develop. Hellhammer were the darker and heavier band of the foursome and would later evolve into the group Celtic Frost.

Running Wild's songs appear as Japanese bonus tracks on their 1995 album, Masquerade; Helloween's tracks appear on the second disc of the 2006 remastered and expanded edition of their 1985 album, Walls of Jericho; and Hellhammer's tracks appear on the 1990 re-issue of their 1984 EP, Apocalyptic Raids.

Track listing

Credits
Running Wild
 Rock 'n' Rolf Kasparek – vocals, guitars
 Gerald "Preacher" Warnecke – guitars
 Stephan Boriss – bass
 Wolfgang "Hasche" Hagemann – drums

Hellhammer
 Tom "Satanic Slaughter" Warrior – vocals, guitars
 Martin "Slayed Necros" Ain – bass
 Bruce "Denial Fiend" Day – drums

Dark Avenger
 Siegfried Kohmann – vocals
 Bernd Piontek – guitars
 Claus Johannson – guitars
 Uwe Neff – bass
 Andreas Breindl – drums

Helloween
 Kai Hansen – vocals, guitars
 Michael Weikath – guitars
 Markus Grosskopf – bass
 Ingo Schwichtenberg – drums

References

Helloween albums
Hellhammer albums
Running Wild (band) albums
1984 EPs
Split EPs
Noise Records EPs